Portugal was present at the Eurovision Song Contest 1986, held in Bergen, Norway.

Before Eurovision

Festival da Canção 1986 
The Portuguese national final to select their entry, the Festival RTP da Canção 1986, was held on 22 March at the Rádio e Televisão de Portugal Studios in Lisbon, and was hosted by Henrique Mendes and Maria Helena Fialho Gouveia, who hosted the very first Portuguese Contest in 1964.

Mendes and Fialho Gouveia introduced and made light commentary on the songs, which were taped in advance for the television audience. Each television region in Portugal (Ponta Delgada, Funchal, Porto and Lisbon) submitted three songs for this year's Festival. An "expert" jury decided the winner, and only the placement of the top three songs were made public.

The winning entry was one of the songs from Lisbon, "Não sejas mau para mim", performed by Dora and composed by Guilherme Inês, Zé Da Ponte, and Luís Manuel de Oliveira Fernandes.

At Eurovision
Dora was the twentieth and last performer on the night of the contest, following Finland. At the close of the voting the song had received 28 points, placing 14th in a field of 20 competing countries. Despite its low placing, it would be the highest rank Portugal would receive in the Contest between 1985 and 1990.

Voting

References

External links
Portuguese National Final 1986

1986
Countries in the Eurovision Song Contest 1986
Eurovision